During 1791 in Spain there was the ending of the siege of Ceuta. There was the prevalence of the slave trade. Spain still held territory within the Southern part of the United States (Seminole Territory). 
Events from the year 1791 in Spain

Incumbents
 Monarch – Charles IV
 Hector, baron de Carondelet

Events

Battles
The siege of Ceuta 

People
Father Miguel Hidalgo y Costilla 
He was named rector of his alma mater. However, shortly thereafter, he was removed from that position and sent into semi-exile to be a curate in the town of Colima.

Births

 Jose Melchor Gomiz
Nicolás Ledesma
Ángel de Saavedra, 3rd Duke of Rivas
Manuela Malasaña

Deaths

 25 August - José Iglesias de la Casa (born 1748)
 15 September - Tomás de Iriarte

References

 
Years of the 18th century in Spain